The North Dakota High School Boys Hockey program is a high school ice hockey program in the State of North Dakota.  The first boys hockey competition took place in 1966-1967 and was won by Grand Forks Central High School.

The North Dakota High School Activities Association (NDHSAA) began fully sponsoring boys hockey in the 1966-67 season after a trial period that lasted one year (1965–66). The 1967 state tournament at Grand Forks was the sport’s seventh overall state tournament played in North Dakota, but the first tournament as a fully NDHSAA-sponsored sport. Grand Forks High School (now Grand Forks Central) won all six of the non-sponsored championships during the previous years.

Grand Forks Central holds the most boys titles (29). As of 2023, the current boys champions are the Fargo South/Shanley Bruins. There are currently 19 high school hockey programs split into two regions. The west region is made up of Bismarck High, Bismarck Legacy,Bismarck Century, Bottineau/Rugby, Hazen/Beulah, Minot, Williston, Dickinson, Jamestown, and Mandan. The east region consists of Grand Forks Central, Grand Forks Red River, Fargo North, Fargo Davies, West Fargo, Grafton/Park River, Fargo South/ Shanley, West Fargo Sheyenne, Mayville/Portland-Clifford-Galesburg, and Devils Lake.

References 

Welcome to the NDHSAA | NDSHAA.com.
North Dakota State High School League 2004-2005 Annual Report.
John Rosengren's book Blades of Glory: The True Story of a Young Team Bred to Win (2003, Sourcebooks, Inc.) follows the 2000-2001 Bloomington-Jefferson Jaguars' season.

External links

High school ice hockey in the United States
High